Cyclocheilichthys armatus is a species of ray-finned fish in the genus Cyclocheilichthys.

Footnotes 

 

armatus
Fish described in 1842